Slagg is a surname. Notable people with the surname include:

 John Slagg (1837–1889), British businessman and politician
 Stanley Slagg (1903–1978), American lawyer and politician

Other
 Glenda Slagg, fictional columnist in the magazine Private Eye